Woodgate is an area in Leicester in Fosse Ward. It lies west of the River Soar and is an important entrance to the city leading on to Frog Island. A busy junction, its northern end lies at the intersection of Fosse Road North, Groby Road, Blackbird Road and Buckminster Road. To the south is the Rally Park, which was formerly the goods yard of the London Midland Railway, which was originally the Leicester to Swannington Railway built by Robert Stephenson in 1832. To the west  is Fosse Road North. At its eastern end Woodgate terminates at the North Bridge over the old River Soar.

History
The name dates from the medieval period. It likely comes from the history of using this road to bring timber into the town from the nearby woodlands.

The majority of the housing dates from the beginning of the 20th century, and like Newfoundpool was developed mainly by local builder Orson Wright. Before that time the area north of Woodgate, known as St Leonard's, was the principal residential area, and had been so for many centuries. Woodgate was a Housing Action Area in the late 1980s, when many properties were refurbished by Leicester City Council, and it forms part of the current regeneration plans for the city.

In the past Woodgate had a significant number of active factories, including hosiery, dyeworks, an iron foundry, light engineering and biscuit manufacture. The area has suffered from industrial decline with the closure of The Premier Screw and Repetition factory with over 100 redundancies. The site has often been vandalised. The former pubs, "The Friar Tuck" and "The Old Robin Hood" have long been derelict and been the scenes of crime including a murder. The former Nabisco factory site, home to a few small businesses and local Labour party offices was demolished in April 2008. This is the site of a new Aldi supermarket opened in November 2008. Other local businesses lie down Storey Street.  The gothic Victorian St Leonard's Parish Church was demolished in the early 1990s and was replaced with a Kwikfit service station.  St Leonard's Vicarage went at much the same time and was replaced by a car showroom.  Woodgate itself remains a busy local shopping street with a bank, butcher, florist, hairdressers, optician, accountant, bakery (amongst others), Indian and Portuguese restaurants, a Chinese takeaway and traditional fish and chip shop. Woodgate has a primary school based on Balfour Street, and is also served by another on Slater Street.

Sites
The area is in Fosse Ward for local government purposes and part of the Leicester West parliamentary constituency at Westminster, the local MP from May 2010 is Liz Kendall. Previous MPs were Patricia Hewitt, Greville Janner and his father Barnett Janner.

The Woodgate Resources Centre is used for local social gatherings: it was formerly a library.

Also near to Woodgate is the Woodgate Adventure Playground on the Rally Park which is used by local children for recreation.  The former Midland railway line is now a cycle/foot path leading in the direction of Glenfield and Groby to the north, and towards Leicester city centre to the south.

References

External links
Woodgate Residents Association

Areas of Leicester
Leicester